Colonel Maharaja Sir Sajjan Singh   (18 July 1859 – 23 December 1884), was the Maharana of princely state of Udaipur (r. 1874 – 1884). He was a son of Shakti Singh of Bagore and was adopted by his first cousin Maharana Shambhu Singh, whom he succeeded in 1874. He adopted Fateh Singh, a descendant of Sangram Singh II from Shivrati branch of the family.

References 

Mewar dynasty
1859 births
1884 deaths
History of Udaipur
Knights Grand Commander of the Order of the Star of India